Kawachiya Kikusuimaru (河内家 菊水丸) (born 14 February 1963) is a Japanese musician and singer. He is a singer of Kawachi ondo folk music from Yao, Osaka.

Career
Born in Yao, Osaka, he started studying Kawachi ondo with his father, Kawachiya Kikusui, at the age of nine. He came to national attention in 1991 with his reggae-style song "Kakin Ondo" (カーキン音頭, kaakin ondo) which was featured in a television commercial for recruitment magazine "From A" (フロム・エー). Kawachiya is known for performing in a wide variety of countries, from Hawaii in 1983 to Baghdad in 1990 (at the Iraq for peace festival) and Pyongyang in 1995.

He is also a writer and newspaper contributor. One of his published works is Kikusuimaru's Scrapbook (菊水丸のスクラップ帖), a collection of his articles for the Osaka Shimbun newspaper.

Discography
Contributing artist
 The Rough Guide to the Music of Japan (1999, World Music Network)

References

External links
mini-biography, listing international performances

1963 births
Living people
People from Yao, Osaka
Musicians from Osaka Prefecture